Suzanne Hazel Read Goddard, KC (born 26 September 1963) is a British judge.

She took A levels at Wrekin College and a degree in law at the University of Manchester.

She was a member of Lincoln House Chambers, where she commenced pupillage in 1986. She became a recorder in 2002, a QC in 2008 (which became King's Counsel (KC) in 2022 upon the death of Queen Elizabeth II), and a circuit judge, on the Northern Circuit, in May 2015.

Notable cases over which she presided include the 2020 trial of the serial rapist Reynhard Sinaga.

She was defence barrister for television presenter Fred Talbot in 2015.

References

External links 

 International Women’s Day 2020 podcast featuring Goddard

Living people
1963 births
English King's Counsel
21st-century King's Counsel
21st-century English judges
Circuit judges (England and Wales)
British women judges
21st-century women judges
Alumni of the University of Manchester
People educated at Wrekin College